Rig District is in Ganaveh County, Bushehr province, Iran. At the 2006 census, its population was 12,827 in 2,761 households. The following census in 2011 counted 13,463 people in 3,366 households. At the latest census in 2016, the district had 13,825 inhabitants living in 3,996 households.

References 

Districts of Bushehr Province
Populated places in Ganaveh County